Charles Mckee (born February 2, 1950) is a former American football wide receiver in the National Football League for the Minnesota Vikings and New England Patriots. He also was a member of the Detroit Wheels of the World Football League. He was selected by the Dallas Cowboys in the second round (52nd overall) of the 1972 NFL Draft. He played college football at the University of Arizona.

Early years
Mckee attended Phoenix Union High School, where he practiced football and basketball. He accepted a football scholarship from the University of Arizona, finishing his career with 85 receptions for 1,652 receiving yards (school record) and 19 touchdowns (school record). His nickname was "Earl the Pearl".

As a junior, he was second on the team with 26 receptions for 496 yards and 9 touchdowns (led the team). As a senior, he was a co-captain and the team's deep threat, posting 43 receptions for 854 receiving yards (205 yards against Oregon State University) and 5 touchdowns. He also played in the Senior Bowl.

Professional career

Dallas Cowboys
McKee was selected by the Dallas Cowboys in the second round (52nd overall) of the 1972 NFL Draft. He had a disappointing training camp and was waived before the season started on September 11.

Minnesota Vikings
On September 19, 1972, he was claimed off waivers by the Minnesota Vikings and placed on the taxi squad. He was cut on October 20.

New England Patriots
On November 27, 1972, he was signed by the New England Patriots to the taxi squad. He was released on September 12, 1973.

Detroit Wheels (WFL)
In 1974, he was signed by the Detroit Wheels of the World Football League. In the third game, he broke his right hand against The Hawaiians and was placed on the disabled list. For the season he posted 6 receptions for 91 yards (long of 46). After finishing in last place (1-13 record), the league folded the team.

Denver Broncos
In 1975, he signed with the Denver Broncos but was released on July 28.

New York Jets
On August 5, 1975, he was signed by the New York Jets and was released on August 11.

References

External links
Wildcat Threat

Living people
1950 births
Players of American football from Arizona
American football wide receivers
Arizona Wildcats football players
Minnesota Vikings players
New England Patriots players
Detroit Wheels players